Ochroconis is a genus of fungi belonging to the family Sympoventuriaceae.

The genus has cosmopolitan distribution.

Species

Species:

Ochroconis ailanthi 
Ochroconis aquatica 
Ochroconis atlantica 
Ochroconis constricta

References

Dothideomycetes
Dothideomycetes genera